Thorbräu is one of the oldest breweries in Germany,  founded in 1582 in Augsburg, Bavaria. Their beer is brewed in a specific standard that is not a part of the Reinheitsgebot, but of Augsburg's own beer purity laws that have been set since 1156, explaining that no version of beer can be brewed using inferior ingredients resulting in an inferior beer.

This tradition has been continued since 1875 by a 4th generation family. As one of the main proprietors of the regularly held Wertachbruckerthorfest, Thorbräu is clearly committed to an Augsburg tradition that has never faltered, and is still in operation currently. The brewery itself is only a roughly thirty minute travel time to Munich, for the annual Oktoberfest.

External links 
Official web site

Companies based in Augsburg
Beer and breweries in Bavaria
1582 establishments in the Holy Roman Empire